Paracylindromorphus is a genus of beetles in the family Buprestidae, containing the following species:

Species
 Paracylindromorphus achardi (Obenberger, 1928)
 Paracylindromorphus africanus (Obenberger, 1924)
 Paracylindromorphus albifrons (Théry, 1905)
 Paracylindromorphus alluaudi (Kerremans, 1914)
 Paracylindromorphus assamensis Obenberger, 1947
 Paracylindromorphus bakeri (Obenberger, 1928)
 Paracylindromorphus birmanicus Obenberger, 1947
 Paracylindromorphus bodongi (Kerremans, 1914)
 Paracylindromorphus bodongianus Théry, 1954
 Paracylindromorphus braunsi (Obenberger, 1923)
 Paracylindromorphus burgeoni Théry, 1954
 Paracylindromorphus cairensis Théry, 1930
 Paracylindromorphus carinulosus Cobos, 1953
 Paracylindromorphus cashmirensis Obenberger, 1935
 Paracylindromorphus cephalopristis Bellamy in Bellamy & Hespenheide, 1988
 Paracylindromorphus cephalotes Cobos, 1960
 Paracylindromorphus chinensis (Obenberger, 1927)
 Paracylindromorphus congolanus (Obenberger, 1924)
 Paracylindromorphus corporaali (Obenberger, 1922)
 Paracylindromorphus docilis (Kerremans, 1914)
 Paracylindromorphus drescheri Obenberger, 1932
 Paracylindromorphus elongatulus Cobos, 1960
 Paracylindromorphus formosanus (Miwa & Chûjô, 1935)
 Paracylindromorphus fujianensis Kubán, 2006
 Paracylindromorphus gebhardti (Obenberger, 1927)
 Paracylindromorphus grandis Cobos, 1953
 Paracylindromorphus helferi Cobos, 1960
 Paracylindromorphus hovus Théry, 1929
 Paracylindromorphus japanensis (Saunders, 1873)
 Paracylindromorphus javanicus (Obenberger, 1928)
 Paracylindromorphus jeanneli (Kerremans, 1914)
 Paracylindromorphus juvenilis (Kerremans, 1903)
 Paracylindromorphus klapperichi Obenberger, 1947
 Paracylindromorphus larminati Baudon, 1968
 Paracylindromorphus lebedevi (Obenberger, 1928)
 Paracylindromorphus levicollis (Péringuey, 1908)
 Paracylindromorphus machulkai Obenberger, 1935
 Paracylindromorphus montanus (Obenberger, 1924)
 Paracylindromorphus montivagus Fisher, 1935
 Paracylindromorphus munroi (Obenberger, 1928)
 Paracylindromorphus mutilloides Théry, 1954
 Paracylindromorphus natalensis (Obenberger, 1928)
 Paracylindromorphus orientalis (Kerremans, 1892)
 Paracylindromorphus pinguis (Fairmaire, 1876)
 Paracylindromorphus planithorax Cobos, 1960
 Paracylindromorphus puberulus Cobos, 1960
 Paracylindromorphus rhodesicus (Obenberger, 1924)
 Paracylindromorphus richteri Théry, 1937
 Paracylindromorphus rivularis (Obenberger, 1924)
 Paracylindromorphus salisburyensis Théry, 1954
 Paracylindromorphus sculpturatus Cobos, 1953
 Paracylindromorphus semenovi Théry, 1937
 Paracylindromorphus sericatus Théry, 1954
 Paracylindromorphus similis Cobos, 1953
 Paracylindromorphus simlaicus (Obenberger, 1924)
 Paracylindromorphus sinae Obenberger, 1947
 Paracylindromorphus sinuatus (Abeille de Perrin, 1897)
 Paracylindromorphus somalicus (Kerremans, 1898)
 Paracylindromorphus spinipennis (Bedel, 1890)
 Paracylindromorphus srogli Obenberger, 1932
 Paracylindromorphus subcylindricus (Kerremans, 1899)
 Paracylindromorphus subuliformis (Mannerheim, 1837)
 Paracylindromorphus sundaicus Obenberger, 1935
 Paracylindromorphus superbus Théry, 1954
 Paracylindromorphus tananarivensis Obenberger, 1942
 Paracylindromorphus thomasseti (Obenberger, 1928)
 Paracylindromorphus togoensis (Obenberger, 1924)
 Paracylindromorphus tokioensis Théry, 1937
 Paracylindromorphus transverserugosus (Obenberger, 1924)
 Paracylindromorphus transversicollis (Reitter, 1913)
 Paracylindromorphus ukerewensis Obenberger, 1935
 Paracylindromorphus vansoni Obenberger, 1935
 Paracylindromorphus verlainei Théry, 1954
 Paracylindromorphus villiersi Descarpentries, 1970
 Paracylindromorphus waterloti Théry, 1929

References

Buprestidae genera